The germinal epithelium is the epithelial layer of the seminiferous tubules of the testicles. It is also known as the wall of the seminiferous tubules. The cells in the epithelium are connected via tight junctions.

There are two types of cells in the germinal epithelium. The large Sertoli cells (which are not dividing) function as supportive cells to the developing sperm. The second cell type are the cells belonging to the spermatogenic cell lineage. These develop to eventually become sperm cells (spermatozoon). Typically, the spermatogenic cells will make four to eight layers in the germinal epithelium.

References

External links
  - "Male Reproductive System: testis, germinal epithelium"
  - "Stratified Germinal Epithelium"
 

Mammal male reproductive system